Bucyrus City School District is a public school district serving students in the city of Bucyrus, Ohio, United States. The school district enrolls 1,587 students as of the 2008–2009 academic year.

Schools

Elementary school
Bucyrus Elementary School (K-5)

Middle school
Bucyrus Secondary School (6-8)

High school
Bucyrus High School (9-12)

References

External links
Bucyrus City School District website

School districts in Ohio
Education in Crawford County, Ohio
School District